North Branch Basket Creek is a river in Delaware County and Sullivan County in New York. It flows into Basket Creek northeast of Basket.

References

Rivers of New York (state)
Rivers of Delaware County, New York
Rivers of Sullivan County, New York